William Thomas Ryckman is a former professional American football player who played wide receiver for three seasons with the Atlanta Falcons.  He is the host of The Sports Note, a sports talk radio program aired on ESPN radio affiliate KPEL 1420 AM in Lafayette, Louisiana.

References

1955 births
Living people
Sportspeople from Lafayette, Louisiana
American football wide receivers
Louisiana Tech Bulldogs football players
Atlanta Falcons players
Players of American football from Louisiana
Radio personalities from Louisiana